The Southern Pacific Railroad Passenger Station and Freight House, located in Springfield, Oregon, United States, is listed on the National Register of Historic Places.

See also
 National Register of Historic Places listings in Lane County, Oregon
 Goleta Depot, in Goleta, California, a similar two-story depot

References

External links
Springfield, Oregon City Landmark Inventory
Springfield, Oregon Southern Pacific Depot (Denver Rails Website)

1891 establishments in Oregon
1965 disestablishments in Oregon
National Register of Historic Places in Lane County, Oregon
Railway buildings and structures on the National Register of Historic Places in Oregon
Railway freight houses on the National Register of Historic Places
Railway stations closed in 1965
Railway stations on the National Register of Historic Places in Oregon
Railway stations in the United States opened in 1891
Former Southern Pacific Railroad stations in Oregon
Springfield, Oregon
Transportation buildings and structures in Lane County, Oregon